Avengers: Infinity War is a 2018 American superhero film based on the Marvel Comics superhero team the Avengers. Produced by Marvel Studios and distributed by Walt Disney Studios Motion Pictures, it is the sequel to The Avengers (2012) and Avengers: Age of Ultron (2015), and the 19th film in the Marvel Cinematic Universe (MCU). Directed by Anthony and Joe Russo and written by Christopher Markus and Stephen McFeely, the film features an ensemble cast including Robert Downey Jr., Chris Hemsworth, Mark Ruffalo, Chris Evans, Scarlett Johansson, Benedict Cumberbatch, Don Cheadle, Tom Holland, Chadwick Boseman, Paul Bettany, Elizabeth Olsen, Anthony Mackie, Sebastian Stan, Danai Gurira, Letitia Wright, Dave Bautista, Zoe Saldaña, Josh Brolin, and Chris Pratt. In the film, the Avengers and the Guardians of the Galaxy attempt to prevent Thanos from collecting the six all-powerful Infinity Stones as part of his quest to kill half of all life in the universe.

Avengers: Infinity War premiered in Los Angeles on April 23, 2018, and was released in the United States on April 27, as part of Phase Three of the MCU. Made on a production budget of $325–400 million, it was the fourth film and the first superhero film to gross over $2billion worldwide, breaking numerous box office records, and becoming the highest-grossing film of 2018 and the fourth-highest-grossing film of all time both worldwide and in the United States and Canada. On the review aggregator website Rotten Tomatoes, the film holds an approval rating of  based on  reviews.

The film has received various awards and nominations. Avengers: Infinity War received a nomination for Best Visual Effects at the 91st Academy Awards. It won one of two nominations at the 45th Saturn Awards.

Accolades

References

External links
 

Avengers (comics) lists
Avengers (film series)
Marvel Cinematic Universe lists of accolades by film
Marvel Cinematic Universe: Phase Three